Johannes Schneider (5 August 1887 – 8 September 1914) was a German international footballer who played for VfB Leipzig. He was also capped twice for the German national team in 1913.

References

External links
 

1887 births
1914 deaths
Association football goalkeepers
German footballers
Germany international footballers
1. FC Lokomotive Leipzig players
German military personnel killed in World War I
Footballers from Leipzig
People from the Kingdom of Saxony